Mulan: Rise of a Warrior, also known as Mulan: Legendary Warrior, is a 2009 Chinese action war film starring Zhao Wei as the titular protagonist. The director, Jingle Ma, has explained that this film is vastly different from the 1998 Walt Disney animated film and that the looks from the character in this movie adheres more to his imagination. Zhao Wei was cast by Ma as Hua Mulan over actresses Zhang Ziyi, Michelle Yeoh, and Liu Yifei, who were all considered for the role.

Plot

In 450 A.D., the ruling Chinese dynasty of Northern Wei is under constant threat from the Rouran tribes. The Chinese army conducts a nationwide draft. A retired soldier named Hua Hu insists on enlisting again to serve his country. Hua Mulan (Zhao Wei), his young daughter, is quite intelligent and skilled in various martial arts. But because she is a woman, she cannot enlist. At night, Mulan takes her father's armor and weapon, disguises herself as a man and slips out of the house with the family horse. Enlisting with the Wei army in her father's place, she is recognized by her friend Fei Xiaohu "Tiger" (Jaycee Chan), who agrees to keep her secret.

Mulan befriends Wentai (Chen Kun), the battalion's sub commander, as well as other recruits "Scholar" and "Fatso" and his younger brother. Throughout the harsh military training, Mulan proves to be courageous and already skilled in combat, defending others from the bullying of the army commander's nephew, "Turtle".

One night, when Mulan is taking a bath in a secluded hot spring, Wentai unexpectedly runs into Mulan. After a brief skirmish, Mulan escapes without exposing her identity. However, Wentai becomes determined to uncover the woman hiding in the camp. To make matters worse, during training Turtle unknowingly dropped a valuable jade pendant, which Tiger furtively kicked into a nearby lake as an act of revenge. Accusing the battalion of theft, the army commander orders a strip-search. Tiger is unable to find the jade pendant in the lake and Mulan, terrified to reveal herself as a woman and tarnish her father's reputation, admits to having committed the theft.

In prison awaiting execution, she tells Wentai the truth that she is a woman and asks him to keep her death secret from her father. Wentai agrees and states that he will personally burn her body so that nobody will know her secret. However, the Rourans launch a surprise attack on the camp and in the confusion, Wentai releases Mulan from jail. Mulan, however, stays to fight and ends up killing the Rouran assault's commander. As a result, she is pardoned and is promoted to be a sub-commander. A funeral is held for the army commander, who died in the assault, and, having lost his uncle, Turtle ceases bullying and befriends the other soldiers.

Gaining further achievements throughout the war, eventually both Wentai and Mulan become generals, however, Mulan has had to witness the deaths of her comrades including Fatso and his brother. During one excursion, Wentai and his men are ambushed and Wentai orders Mulan to stay behind to guard the army's supply train as he reinforces the front. Afraid for Wentai, Mulan delegates the order to Scholar and follows after him. Scholar and his men are ambushed in turn, and Mulan is devastated at the deaths she has caused. Wentai reminds her not to become emotionally invested on the battlefield. When she asks whether he would have done the same for her, Wentai says, "I wouldn't." When Mulan wishes to leave the army and no longer serve as a general, Wentai reminds her that none of them wish to fight and that she must do her duty regardless.

Allowing an apathetic Mulan to stay in camp, Wentai leaves for another battle. Tiger returns to inform Mulan that Wentai has died and that his final words were for her to remain strong. Mulan is devastated and takes to drinking. With the help of Tiger, however, she returns to her army life and achieves many successive victories. It is revealed that Wentai is, in fact, alive; he and Tiger are keeping this secret so that Mulan can remain emotionally unattached and strong.

Unhappy that the Rouran tribes are discussing ending their raids due to heavy casualties, Prince Mendu murders his own father and succeeds him as chief, just after his sister the princess of all the rourans proposed to her father the Danyu that she should become the queen of the wei and the 150 year old rourans people for peace and commerce between north and south, her father confessing she should be a younger Girl, thus not in Danyu lineage. Prince Mendu silences dissent in the Rourans and launches a huge attack force into the Wei land, intent on finally gaining metal-rich lands that the Rourans have lacked for generations.

Mulan proposes a strategy to the Wei army commanders that her army will initially engage the Rourans at a predetermined location, allowing for a larger Wei force to ambush the Rourans from behind. Mulan's troops fight strongly against the Rourans, but many, including Mulan, are injured in a volley of arrow fire. Suddenly, a huge dust storm known as the Poison Dragon appears, and everyone on the battlefield is consumed by it. When they regain consciousness, Mulan is reunited with Wentai and, seeing Rouran reserves entering the battlefield, orders a retreat back into the closed canyon. Injured Wei soldiers, including Tiger, are left behind in the hasty retreat. Knowing that Mulan is trapped within the canyon, Mendu stops his army at the entrance. Supplies that were supposed to be pre-delivered are found to be missing, and so Mulan's forces rapidly languish in the following days. Mulan is very sick but is kept alive by Wentai, who gives her his own blood to drink as the provisions of water have run out.

The Rourans goad Mulan's troops, executing the captured injured Wei troops, including Tiger, that were left behind during the retreat. Turtle is killed in an emotional attempt to stop the executions. When Mulan realizes that the Wei Commander-in-Chief isn't bringing his troops and has betrayed Mulan out of jealousy of her skill, she prepares her impoverished troops for a final fight to the death. However, Wentai goes to the front line and announces he is the 7th Prince of Wei; he offers to be taken prisoner in return for Mulan and her soldiers' freedom. Mendu takes him prisoner and delivers provisions and medics to Mulan and her troops.

Ordering her soldiers to return home without her, Mulan disguises herself as a Rouran woman and infiltrates Mendu's camp to save Wentai. Secretly meeting with the Rouran princess, she reveals her gender as a woman and two share their dream to stop the war and have peace. Mendu announces that the Wei emperor has agreed to Wentai's ransom and noisy celebrations initiate throughout the camp. Scuffling in Mendu's tent, Mulan assassinates Mendu with the help of the Rouran princess and the previous Rouran chief's loyal servant, Gude.  She then returns to the Wei capital, where she at last reveals herself as a woman. The Wei emperor offers her any reward but Mulan asks only to return to her village to take care of her ill father. The emperor also announces the engagement of the Rouran princess and Wentai to bring peace to the two empires, the Rourans and the Wei civilisation, just as the princess oracled. Back at Mulan's hometown, Wentai visits her to ask her to run away with him, but Mulan chooses the good of the country over their romantic relationship. He respects her decision, and the two share a long passionate embrace before Wentai departs.

The movie ends with Mulan saying, "Someone once said, go too far from home and you will lose your roots. Kill too many people, and you will forget yourself. If you die in battle, your life will sink into the ground like rain and vanish without a trace. If at that time, you fall in love with someone, hope will blossom again from the earth and embrace life passionately. Thank you, Wentai."

Cast
 Zhao Wei as Hua Mulan
 Xu Jiao as young Hua Mulan
 Chen Kun as Wentai
 Hu Jun as Mendu
 Jaycee Chan as Fei Xiaohu
 Nicky Lee as Hu Kui
 Liu Yuxin as the Rouran princess
 Yu Rongguang as Hua Hu
 Vitas as Gude
 Sun Zhou as the Wei emperor

This was the second collaboration between Beijing Film Academy classmates Zhao Wei and Chen Kun after Painted Skin.

Reception
On the film's opening day Beijing Screen, the Chinese government recognized Mulan: In 2011, Mulan earned the 9th Henan province governmental award - movie category of Achieving Five Top Project Prize

Home media 
In the United Kingdom, it was 2020's third best-selling foreign language film on physical home video formats (below Parasite and Weathering with You).

Theme song
The end theme song performed by Stefanie Sun, "Mulan Qing" (木蘭情; "Mulan Love") was composed by Lee Shih Shiong with lyrics by Kevin Yee. It was nominated for Best Original Song at the 29th Hong Kong Film Awards. Vitas covered it in English as "Beneath the Glory".

An insert song, "Mulan Xing" (木蘭星; "Mulan Star"), was performed by Jane Zhang.

Awards

See also
 Hua Mulan
 Mulan (2020 film)

References

External links
 
 Theme song MV on YouTube
 the historical of Mu Lan

Films about Hua Mulan
2009 films
Chinese historical adventure films
Chinese historical romance films
2000s Mandarin-language films
Films set in the 5th century
Films set in the Northern and Southern dynasties
Films directed by Jingle Ma
Cross-dressing in film
Funimation
Chinese war films
2000s action war films
Chinese historical action films
Films scored by Tan Dun